Piece of Mind is a 1983 album by Iron Maiden.

Piece of Mind may also refer to:
Piece of Mind (Tela album), 1996
Piece of Mind, a 2003 album by Robin Lane
"Piece of Mind", a song by Joey Badass from his 2015 album B4.Da.$$
"Piece of Mind", a song by Kehlani from her 2017 album SweetSexySavage
Piece of Mind, a 1987 composition for wind ensemble by Dana Wilson
Piece of Mind (manga) winner of the 2019 International Manga Award
"Piece of Mind", a song by Idris Muhammad from his 1974 album Power of Soul
"Piece of Mind", a song by Curved Air from their 1971 album ''Second Album

See also
Peace of Mind (disambiguation)